Grand Duke George Mikhailovich of Russia (also spelled Romanoff; ; born 13 March 1981) is the heir apparent to Maria Vladimirovna, a claimant to the disputed Headship of the Imperial Family of Russia. He is the only child of Maria and her former husband, Prince Franz Wilhelm of Prussia. George's mother attributes to him the title of Tsesarevich and he bears, as a title of pretence, the prefix of "Grand Duke" with the style of Imperial Highness which is still being questioned. As the son of a cadet member of the branch of the House of Hohenzollern which formerly ruled the German Empire and Kingdom of Prussia, he is also sometimes entitled "Prince of Prussia" with the style of Royal Highness.

Early life
George was born in Madrid in 1981, the son of Grand Duchess Maria Vladimirovna of Russia (daughter and heir of Vladimir Cyrillovich, Grand Duke of Russia) and her husband Prince Franz Wilhelm of Prussia (titled at the time Grand Duke Michael Pavlovich, son of Prince Karl Franz of Prussia and Princess Henriette of Schönaich-Carolath).

George was baptised on 6 May 1981, in Madrid; his godfather is Constantine II of Greece. Also present at the baptism were King Juan Carlos and Queen Sofía of Spain and Simeon II and Queen Margarita of Bulgaria. The announcement that George Mikhailovich would be known as a Russian Grand Duke prompted Prince Vasili Alexandrovich, then president of the Romanov Family Association, to respond in writing that "The Romanov Family Association hereby declares that the joyful event in the Prussian Royal House does not concern the Romanov Family Association since the newborn prince is not a member of either the Russian Imperial House or of the Romanov family". This response was ignored by Grand Duke Vladimir as he had already selected his daughter to succeed him according to the Pauline laws, and because the marriage between her and Prince Franz Wilhelm of Prussia was deemed dynastic. Prior to their wedding, the Grand Duke and his first cousin, then Head of the House of Hohenzollern, Prince Louis Ferdinand of Prussia, had made a dynastic agreement that any child born from this marriage should be raised as a Romanov. Therefore, George is considered a dynast of both houses (Romanov and Hohenzollern), as his father has never renounced his Prussian royal title.

His father, who stopped using his Russian title after his separation, has said of his son, "I have his German passport right here; I always carry it with me. It says he is Prince George of Prussia".

George spent the first years of his life in France before moving to Spain. There he and his mother lived, along with his maternal grandmother, in the home of his maternal aunt, Helen Kirby, who inherited a significant fortune from her father, Sumner Moore Kirby.

Education and career
George was educated at Runnymede College in Madrid, D'Overbroeck's College, Oxford and at St Benet's Hall, Oxford.

In Brussels, he worked at the European Parliament where he was an assistant to Loyola de Palacio, former European Commissioner for Transport and Energy. Later he moved to Luxembourg where he was employed at the European Commission's Directorate-General for Atomic Energy and Security.

On 12 December 2008, he was appointed an aide to the Director General of MMC Norilsk Nickel, a major Russian nickel-mining company. In 2012 he was nominated chief executive of Metal Trade Overseas, the main sales hub for Norilsk Nickel in Switzerland. In 2014 he started his own company, Romanoff & Partners, in Brussels.

Heir to his mother
On 21 April 1992, upon the death of his maternal grandfather Grand Duke Vladimir Cyrillovich, George's mother claimed to have succeeded as the sovereign and Curatrix of the Throne of Russia, making him, to supporters of his mother, heir-apparent and tsesarevich. He visited Russia for the first time shortly thereafter to attend the funeral of his grandfather. His claim to the throne is contested.

In 1996, when he, his mother, and his grandmother Leonida returned to Russia after living in Madrid, one of President Boris Yeltsin's former bodyguards was assigned as tutor to the 15-year-old prince. He was also set to study at a Russian Naval college but these plans were dropped.

On 17 July 2018 he participated, along with his mother, in the liturgical commemoration of the centenary of the assassinations of Saints Nicholas II, Empress Alexandra Feodorovna and their children conducted in Yekaterinburg by Patriarch Kirill I of Moscow.

Marriage and issue
In January 2021, the family announced that George was engaged to marry Victoria Romanovna Bettarini (born Rebecca Virginia Bettarini in Rome on 18 May 1982), having received the permission of Grand Duchess Maria. His mother decreed that Bettarini would have the title of Princess, with the predicate "Her Serene Highness" and the right to use the surname Romanova from her marriage, which therefore implies that theirs is a morganatic union. Victoria Bettarini is the Director of the Russian Imperial Foundation. She is daughter of Roberto Amedeo Simeone Bettarini (born in Taranto on 5 May 1947), an Italian diplomat, ambassador in Luxembourg from 2006 to 2010 and in Brussels from 2010 and 2013, and wife Carla Virginia Cacciatore (born in Rome, Italy, on 30 April 1945), whom he married in Kinshasa, Zaire, on 13 August 1977.

They married on 24 September 2021 in a civil ceremony in Moscow. The religious wedding took place on 1 October in Saint Petersburg, at Saint Isaac's Cathedral. Around 1500 guests attended the ceremony, including King Simeon II of Bulgaria and his wife Queen Margarita; King Fuad II of Egypt; Sheikh Mohammed bin Hamad bin Khalifa of Qatar; Duarte Pio, Duke of Braganza and his wife Isabel, Duchess of Braganza;  Prince Emanuele Filiberto, Prince of Piedmont; Crown Prince Leka of Albania and his wife Crown Princess Elia; Xavier Bettel, Prime Minister of Luxembourg and his husband Gauthier Destenay; Prince Louis Alphonse de Bourbon and his wife Princess Marie Marguerite de Bourbon; Prince Aimone, 6th Duke of Aosta and his wife, born Princess Olga of Greece; Russian monarchist and billionaire Konstantin Malofeev; Sarah Fabergé; European historian and socialite, Stéphane Bern as well as many members of Russian, Spanish and European nobility.

Following the wedding events, a gala wedding supper was held at the Russian Museum of Ethnography in St. Petersburg. The 500 guests included members of the royal houses of Albania, Afghanistan, Austria, Belgium, Bulgaria, Egypt, France, Greece, Italy, Liechtenstein, Portugal, Prussia, Qatar, and Spain. The following day, a Wedding breakfast "à la Russe" was hosted by George's mother, the Grand Duchess Maria, held at Constantine Palace and was attended by a smaller amount of 700 guests before their departures.

On May 22, 2022, the Imperial House of Russia announced that Princess Victoria was expecting their first child in autumn. Later on July 21, the Russian Imperial House announced that the couple were expecting a boy.

The Grand Duke and Princess Victoria had a son, born in Moscow on 21 October 2022, who is named Alexander Georgievich Romanov. Grand Duchess Maria Vladimirovna, head of the Imperial House of Russia, announced that her first grandchild will be called "His Serene Highness Prince Alexander Georgievich Romanov".

Prince Alexander was baptized on December 6, 2022. Prince Alexander's godmothers are Princess Olga, Duchess of Savoy-Aosta; Helene Kirby y Bagration, Countess Dvinskaya; Princess Elizabeth Lopoukhina; Oxana Girko, and Yulia Abrosina. His godfathers are Michel Petrovich Orloff, Prince Joachim Murat, Prince of Pontecorvo; and Prince Stephane Belosselsky-Belozersky. This is the first time a member of the Romanoff family has been baptized in Russia since the Russian Revolution.

Honours

Russian dynastic honours 
  House of Romanov: Knight of the Imperial Order of Saint Andrew
  House of Romanov: Knight of the Imperial Order of Saint Alexander Nevsky
  House of Romanov: Knight of the Imperial Order of the White Eagle
  House of Romanov: Knight Grand Cordon of the Imperial Order of Saint Anna
  House of Romanov: Knight Grand Cordon of the Imperial Order of Saint Stanislas

Foreign dynastic honours 
  Prussian Royal Family: Knight Grand Cross of the Order of the Black Eagle
  Portuguese Royal Family: Knight Grand Cross of the Royal Order of the Immaculate Conception of Vila Viçosa
  Italian Royal Family: Knight Grand Cross of the Order of the Most Holy Annunciation
  Italian Royal Family: Knight Grand Cross of the Order of Saints Maurice and Lazarus
 : Bailiff Knight Grand Cross of Honour and Devotion of the Sovereign Military Order of Malta

Ecclesiastical honours 
 Russian Orthodox Church Outside Russia: Medal of Saint Raphael of Brooklyn, 1st Class
 Archdiocese of Russian Orthodox churches in Western Europe: Order of St. Alexander Nevsky

Ancestry

Notes

References

Further reading

External links
 Official Website of the Russian Imperial Family 

1981 births
Living people
House of Romanov in exile
Recipients of the Order of St. Vladimir, 1st class
Recipients of the Order of St. Anna, 1st class
Recipients of the Order of Saint Stanislaus (Russian), 1st class
Knights Grand Cross of the Order of the Immaculate Conception of Vila Viçosa
Bailiffs Grand Cross of Honour and Devotion of the Sovereign Military Order of Malta
Alumni of St Benet's Hall, Oxford
Collège Stanislas de Paris alumni
Recipients of Order of the Holy Trinity (Ethiopia)